The 2012–13 season was Forfar Athletic's third consecutive season in the Scottish Second Division, having been promoted from the Scottish Third Division at the end of the 2009–10 season. Forfar Athletic also competed in the Challenge Cup, League Cup and the Scottish Cup.

Summary

Season
Forfar finished fourth in the Scottish Second Division, entering the play-offs losing 7–4 to Dunfermline Athletic on aggregate in the Semi-final and remained in the Scottish Second Division. They reached the second round of the Challenge Cup, the first round of the League Cup and the fifth round of the Scottish Cup.

Results & fixtures

Pre season

Scottish Second Division

First Division play-offs

Scottish Challenge Cup

Scottish League Cup

Scottish Cup

Player statistics

Squad 
Last updated 11 May 2013

|}
a.  Includes other competitive competitions, including the play-offs and the Challenge Cup.

Disciplinary record
Includes all competitive matches.
Last updated 11 May 2013

Team statistics

League table

Division summary

Transfers

Players in

Players out

References

Forfar Athletic F.C. seasons
Forfar Athletic